Harold Terry "Bizz" Johnson (December 2, 1907 – March 16, 1988)  was an American businessman and politician who served as a United States Congressman from California from 1959 to 1981. He was a member of the Democratic Party.

Biography
Born in Broderick, California, Johnson earned his lifelong nickname "Bizz" at age four when his uncle observed him leading the other children and compared him to Bismarck. He attended public school in Roseville and the University of Nevada. He worked for the Pacific Fruit Express Company, starting as a clerk before rising to a supervisory position, and was a district chairman of the Brotherhood of Railway Clerks.

Johnson entered politics as a trustee of the Roseville school board in 1941, was elected to the Roseville city council in 1943, and served as mayor of Roseville. In 1948, he was elected to the California State Senate representing Placer, Nevada and Sierra counties. In the legislature, he supported the creation of a four-lane highway across the Sierra Nevada that eventually became Interstate 80. He also sponsored legislation to ensure that the 1960 Winter Olympics would be held in Squaw Valley.

Congress 
Johnson was elected to his first of eleven terms to the U.S. House of Representatives in 1958, eventually becoming chairman of the Committee on Public Works and Transportation in 1977. He was a proponent of the Auburn Dam on the American River, however the project never came to fruition. He was known as a stubborn negotiator and resisted efforts to transfer control of Washington Union Station from the Interior Department to the Transportation Department.

Johnson was reelected by comfortable margins, even as the district turned more conservative. However, Johnson lost reelection to Republican state assemblyman Eugene A. Chappie in 1980 on the back of former California Governor Ronald Reagan's strong victory in that year's presidential election, falling to only 32 percent of the vote. After his defeat, he continued to lobby for uncompleted projects that had been authorized when he in office.

Personal life
Johnson married Albra Irene Manuel of Roseville in 1937, remaining together to her death in 1983, and had a son and daughter. He died on March 16, 1988, at a Sacramento hospital at the age of 80.

Legacy
Highway 65 from Roseville to Lincoln is named the Harold T. Bizz Johnson Expressway.
The interchange at U.S. Route 101 and State Route 92 is named the Harold T. Bizz Johnson Interchange.
 The multi-use trail linking Susanville to Westwood in Lassen County, California is named the Bizz Johnson Trail. Johnson led the transformation of the longest rail to trail project in California.

References

External links

Join California Harold T. Johnson

1907 births
1988 deaths
20th-century American politicians
Democratic Party members of the United States House of Representatives from California
Democratic Party California state senators
Mayors of places in California
California city council members
School board members in California
Clerks
University of Nevada alumni
People from Roseville, California
People from Yolo County, California